Cornell Webster (November 2, 1954 – July 7, 2022) was a professional American football player who played cornerback for four seasons for the  Seattle Seahawks.

References

1954 births
2022 deaths
20th-century African-American sportspeople
African-American players of American football
American football cornerbacks
Seattle Seahawks players
California Golden Bears football players
American restaurateurs
People from Greeneville, Tennessee
Players of American football from Tennessee